Kent McNeil is a Canadian lawyer, currently a Distinguished Research Professor Emeritus and formerly the Robarts Professor of Canadian Studies at York University from 1997 to 1998.

References

Year of birth missing (living people)
Living people
Academic staff of York University
Canadian lawyers
University of Saskatchewan alumni